Clonakilty GAA is a Gaelic football and hurling club based in the town and parish of Clonakilty in County Cork, Ireland. It is affiliated to the Carbery division of Cork. It was founded in October 1887. The club has achieved fame primarily as a Gaelic football club. The club has played in the Cork Senior Football Championship since 1932, the longest-serving senior football team in Cork,  and has won the title on 9 occasions, 1939, 1942, 1943, 1944, 1946, 1947, 1952, 1996 and 2009. The 1945 Cork team that won the All-Ireland Senior Football Championship was backboned by players from Clonakilty.

Honours
 Cork Senior Football Championship (9)
 1939, 1942, 1943, 1944, 1946, 1947, 1952, 1996, 2009
 Cork Intermediate Football Championship (2)
 1913, 1931
 Cork Junior Football Championship (1)
 1930
 Cork Junior Hurling Championship
 Runners-up 1946
 Cork Middle Grade Hurling Championship
 Runners-up 1912
 Cork Under-21 Football Championship
 Runners-up 1999, 2013
 Cork Minor Football Championship
 Runners-up 1940, 1962
 Cork Premier 2 Minor Football Championship
 2013, 2015
 Cork Minor A Hurling Championship (1)
 Winners 2013
 Cork Minor B Hurling Championship 
 Winners 2007
 Cork Under-16A Hurling Championship
 Winners 2013
 Cork Under-16A Hurling League
 Winners 2013
 West Cork Senior Football Championship (2)
 1892, 1893
 West Cork Junior A Hurling Championship (17)
 Winners 1939, 1943, 1944, 1945, 1946, 1950, 1952, 1961, 1962, 1976, 1977, 1983, 2004, 2012, 2015, 2017, 2020
 Runners-up 1926, 1947, 1949, 1954, 1955, 1979, 1980, 2009
 West Cork Middle Hurling Championship 
 Winners 1912
 West Cork Junior C Hurling Championship
 Winners 2013
 West Cork Junior C Hurling League
 Winners 2013
 West Cork Junior A Football Championship (4)
 Winners 1930, 1948, 1949, 1977  Runners-up 1926, 1929, 1972, 1974
 West Cork Under-21 Football Championship (4)
 Winners 1996, 1999, 2013, 2014, 2015 
 West Cork Minor A Hurling Championship
 2013
 West Cork Minor B Hurling Championship
 Winners 2007
 Runners-up 2019
 Cork Intermediate Camogie Championship
 Winners 2009
 Cork Junior A Ladies Football Championship
 Winners 2009
 Munster Junior A Ladies Football Championship
 Winners 2009
 All-Ireland Junior A Ladies Football Championship
 Winners 2009
 Clonakilty and Timoleague Tournaments
 Winners 1892
 West Cork Railway Shields Football and Hurling 
 Winners 1914
 Cork Minor A Football Championship
Winners 2018
 West Cork Minor A Football Championship
Winners 2018
 Cork County Minor A League 
Winners 2018

Notable players

 Thomas Clancy (Cork Minor, U.21 and senior footballer 2010s)
 Tadhgo Crowley (captain 3 in a row 1942-43-44, captain Cork All-Ireland Senior Football Championship winners 1945);
 Kevin Dillon
 Liam Grainger
 Pádraigh Griffin
 Pat Griffin (Kerry All-Ireland medal winner)
 Fachtna O'Donovan (All-Ireland medal winner 1945)
 Eoin O'Mahony
 David Lowney (Cork Minor footballer 2015)
 Seán White (Cork Minor footballer 2013, Cork U.21 footballer 2014,2015)
 Mark White
 Liam O'Donovan (Cork U20 captain 2018)
 Maurice Shanley
 Humphrey O'Neill, Cork All Ireland medal winner 1945
 Dave McCarthy (nephew of Humphrey), Cork All Ireland medal winner 1973

References

External links
Clonakilty GAA
Southern Star article on contribution of "Blow Ins" to Clonakilty successes

Gaelic football clubs in County Cork
Hurling clubs in County Cork
Gaelic games clubs in County Cork
Clonakilty